is a Japanese professional baseball catcher for the Orix Buffaloes in Japan's Nippon Professional Baseball.

Career
In 2015, Mori was named an all-star for the first time in his career.

He was a member of the Melbourne Aces of the Australian Baseball League for the 2017-18 season.

He was again selected as an all-star in 2018.

In 2019 he was named Pacific League MVP.

International career
On October 10, 2018, he was selected Japan national baseball team at the 2018 MLB Japan All-Star Series.

References

External links

NPB.com

1995 births
Living people
Japanese baseball players
Melbourne Aces players
Nippon Professional Baseball catchers
Nippon Professional Baseball designated hitters
Nippon Professional Baseball MVP Award winners
Nippon Professional Baseball right fielders
People from Sakai, Osaka
Saitama Seibu Lions players
Orix Buffaloes players
Baseball people from Osaka Prefecture
Japanese expatriate baseball players in Australia